Elections in the Republic of India in 1970 included the 1970 Kerala Legislative Assembly election and elections to seats in the Rajya Sabha.

Legislative Assembly elections

Kerala

Elections were held in 1970 in Kerala State for the Kerala Legislative Assembly

Rajya Sabha

References

External links

 Election Commission of India

1970 elections in India
India
1970 in India
Elections in India by year